White Satin is a 1960 studio album by the George Shearing quintet and orchestra, arranged by Billy May.

Track listing 
 "Your Name Is Love" (Gene de Paul, Charles Rinker)       
 "Dream" (Johnny Mercer)
 "Laura" (David Raksin, Mercer)
 "There's a Small Hotel" (Richard Rodgers, Lorenz Hart)
 "Old Folks" (Willard Robison, Dedette Lee Hill)
 "Blue Malibu" (George Shearing, Bill Hegner)

Side 2:
 "How Long Has This Been Going On?" (George Gershwin, Ira Gershwin)
 "Love's Melody" (McRae, Swanston)
 "An Affair to Remember" (Harry Warren, Leo McCarey)
 "There'll Be Another Spring" (Peggy Lee, Hubie Wheeler)
 "Moonlight Becomes You" (Jimmy Van Heusen, Johnny Burke)
 "I'll Take Romance" (Ben Oakland, Oscar Hammerstein II)

Personnel 
 George Shearing – piano
 Billy May – arranger

References

Trivia 
The cover of this LP appears in The Beatles' 1964 film A Hard Day's Night at the very beginning of a hotel room scene, in black and white, as was the rest of that movie.  A bit of jazzy piano is heard as the album cover is displayed, but it's not from this record, but rather from Paul McCartney, who's noodling around on a piano in the hotel room.

1960 albums
George Shearing albums
Albums arranged by Billy May
Albums produced by Dave Cavanaugh
Capitol Records albums